Makuva, also known as Makuʼa or Lóvaia, is an apparently extinct Austronesian language spoken at the northeast tip of East Timor near the town of Tutuala.

Makuva has been heavily influenced by neighboring East Timorese Papuan languages, to the extent that it was long thought to be a Papuan language. The ethnic population was 50 in 1981, but the younger generation uses Fataluku as their first or second language.
A 2003 report estimated that there were only five fluent speakers of the language.

Numbers

References

External links 
 ELAR archive of Makuʼa language documentation materials

Timor–Babar languages
Languages of East Timor
Endangered Austronesian languages
Extinct languages of Asia